Nassophasis foveata, is a species of weevil found in India, and Sri Lanka.

It is one of the major orchid pest that attack Aerides fieldingii.

References 

Curculionidae
Insects of Sri Lanka
Beetles described in 1879